Asphalt Watches  is a 2013 Canadian animated film directed by Shayne Ehman and Seth Scriver. It was screened in the Vanguard section at the 2013 Toronto International Film Festival where it won the award for Best Canadian First Feature Film.

References

External links
 

2013 films
2013 animated films
Canadian adult animated films
English-language Canadian films
2010s English-language films
2010s Canadian films
Canadian animated feature films